Sadio Doumbia was the defending champion but chose not to defend his title.

Yuki Bhambri won the title after defeating Ramkumar Ramanathan 4–6, 6–3, 6–4 in the final.

Seeds

Draw

Finals

Top half

Bottom half

References
Main Draw
Qualifying Draw

KPIT MSLTA - Singles
2017 Singles